The Filmfare Critics Award for Best Actress – South is given by Filmfare as part of its annual Filmfare Awards for South Indian films. The award is given by the chosen jury of critics assigned to the function.

List of winners

See also
Filmfare Critics Award for Best Actor - South

References

2015 establishments in India
Awards established in 2015
Filmfare Awards South